Allande (Asturian and Galician-Asturian: Ayande) is a municipality in the Autonomous Community of the Principality of Asturias, Spain. Its capital is Pola de Allande.

The municipality is bordered on the north by Villayón, on the south by Cangas del Narcea and Ibias, to the east by Tineo and to the west by Pesoz, Grandas de Salime and Negueira de Muñiz (in the province of Lugo, Galicia).

The majority of the territory of the municipality is a National Monument. Among its forest riches are thousand-year-old yews in the parishes of Santa Colma and Lago, and the cork forest of Boxu.

Demography
Allande is one of the least populated municipalities in Asturias. Like the rest of the Asturian rural areas, the area is losing population. In the 20th century, there were two major periods of population loss. The first was from 1900 to 1930, where a large number of the inhabitants emigrated to the New World, especially Cuba, Puerto Rico, Argentina, and the Dominican Republic. The second period began in 1960 and is due to the deindustrialization of the countryside, which caused the municipality to lose nearly two-thirds of its population.

Parishes

Holidays
In this municipality a number of local holidays are celebrated. The Nuestra Señora de Avellano (Our Lady of Avellano) in Pola de Allande from September 7 to 10, and Nuestra Señora de Belderaman (Our Lady of Belderaman) on August 15, in the 18th-century sanctuary of the same name in which there is a fountain which, according to legend, cures goiter.

There is also the holidays of San Jorge de Monon on June 29, San Pedro de Valbona on June 29, Santa Isabel in Berducedo the first Sunday in July, San Cristóbal in Campo el Río the second Sunday of July, and San Roque in Fonteta August 16, 17, and 18.

Politics

References 

Populationsdata INE
Postalcodes 
Altitdude Google Earth

External links
www.allande.es 
Federación Asturiana de Concejos 
Allande 
Concejo de Allande 

Municipalities in Asturias

Astures